Karl Theodor Staiger (died 5 October 1888) was a German chemical analyst, naturalist and museum curator. 
Karl Theodor Staiger worked as a chemist for the Queensland Government 1873–80 and worked with Nicholas Miklouho-Maclay. He was secretary to the Queensland Museum from 1876 to 1879.

Works
Partial list
Wurzellaus des Weinstockes (Phylloxera vastatrix in English the Grape Vine Destroyer translated from the German of Geo. David and Issued by the Queensland Board of Enquiry into Diseases of Plants and Animals Brisbane : J.C. Beal, (1878)
with Frederick Manson Bailey An Illustrated Monograph of the Grasses of Queensland (1879).

The tree Eucalyptus staigeriana was named in his honour.

See also

 Ompax spatuloides

References

German naturalists
Year of birth missing
1888 deaths